South Carolina Highway 174 (SC 174) is a  state highway, connecting Edisto Beach with the western part of the Charleston area, in the southeastern part of the U.S. state of South Carolina. The highway was designated a South Carolina scenic byway in 1988. In 2009, the U.S. Department of Transportation declared that a  stretch of SC 174 on Edisto Island would be designated as a National Scenic Byway. According to the South Carolina Department of Transportation (SCDOT), the southern terminus is at the southern terminus of Yacht Club Road, where Palmetto Boulevard changes name to Dock Site Road.

Route description
SC 174 travels generally in a south-to-north direction. Its official southern terminus is located in Edisto Beach in Colleton County at the intersection of Dock Site Road, Palmetto Boulevard, and Yacht Club Road, although its signed southern terminus is located about a quarter-mile east at the intersection of Buoy Road and Dock Site Road. From its southern terminus, SC 174 travels south before curving east along the beach and traveling through the length of Edisto Beach. This is the only section of SC 174 that has four lanes. As SC 174 leaves Edisto Beach, it also enters Charleston County and curves north, beginning its designation as the Edisto Island National Scenic Byway.

As the highway runs across Edisto Island, it travels under an ancient live oak canopy and past small homes, prayer chapels, churches, and country stores and serves as the primary spine road for the island, with smaller country roads and lanes intersecting it and leading to more distant areas of the island. SC 174's National Scenic Byway designation ends when it crosses the North Edisto River and leaves Edisto Island. Further north, the highway intersects with the western terminus of SC 164 and then running through the unincorporated community of Adams Run, where it intersects with the western terminus of SC 162. Continuing north, SC 174 crosses the CSX Railway just before its northern terminus, an intersection with US 17 in the unincorporated community of Osborn.

Major intersections

See also

References

External links

SC 174 at Virginia Highways' South Carolina Highways Annex
Former SC 174 ALT at Virginia Highways' South Carolina Highways Annex

174
Transportation in Charleston County, South Carolina
Transportation in Colleton County, South Carolina